Kaveinga cylindrica is a species of ground beetle in the subfamily Rhysodinae. It was described by Arrow in 1942.

References

Kaveinga
Beetles described in 1942